{{Infobox person
| name               = Ryan Andrews
| caption            = 
| birth_date         = 
| birth_place        = Dublin, Ireland
| occupation         = Actor
| television         = {{nowrap|Fair City}}
}}

Ryan Andrews (born 31 March 1993) is an Irish actor from Donaghmede, Dublin. He is best known for his role as Sean Cassidy in the Irish soap opera, Fair City, for which he has starred in since 2008.

 Career 
Andrews rose to prominence in 2007 following his supporting role in the popular Irish RTÉ drama series, The Clinic.In 2008, Andrews was cast as schoolboy, Sean Cassidy, in the RTÉ soap opera, Fair City. Sean has been at the centre of some of the programme's biggest storylines, including being a suspect in the 2018 Karen O'Neill murder storyline.

Over the years, Andrews has appeared in many short films including 2010's Tribeca Film Festival-nominated, The Pool.

In 2012, Andrews joined Pauline McLynn and Deirdre O'Kane in the Gaiety Theatre production of Fiona Looney's play, Greener. In 2013, he starred alongside Seána Kerslake in the Irish touring production of The Bruising of Clouds. In 2016, Andrews played, Irish poet and writer, Brendan Behan, in the Jim and Peter Sheridan production of Meet the Quare Fellow'' starring alongside Gary Cooke.

Andrews has been a mainstay in the Irish Christmas pantomime scene since 2004, having appeared in the Olympia Theatre annual panto every single year since his debut.

Andrews appeared on the fourth season of the Irish edition of Dancing with the Stars in 2020.

Personal life 
Andrews was born and raised in Donaghmede, a suburb in North Dublin.

Andrews has been in a relationship with actress, dancer, and primary school teacher Michaela O'Neill since 2009. They met while starring in the Olympia Theatre panto together. In August 2021, the couple announced their engagement.

Since 2016, Andrews has been the Director of Drama in the Dublin stage school, StageKidz Academy with two locations in Dublin.

Filmography

References

External links 

 

Male actors from Dublin (city)
Irish male television actors
1993 births
Living people
People from Donaghmede